Noah is a recurring fictional character from the fifth season of the AMC television series The Walking Dead portrayed by Tyler James Williams. He is first encountered as a hospital ward in Grady Memorial Hospital in Atlanta by Beth Greene, with whom he forms a good relationship. After Beth's death, he leaves Grady and joins Rick Grimes' group. He becomes the driving force for the group to go to Richmond, Virginia to find his former community named Shirewilt, only to discover it was destroyed, so he stays with the group when they reach and join the Alexandria Safe-Zone.

Television series

Fictional character biography

In the episode "Slabtown", Noah is a young male patient at the hospital who often works as a janitor. He tells Beth Greene that both he and his father were from Richmond, Virginia, where they "had walls". They were discovered by the Grady Memorial group while the two of them were being surround by walkers, and their "rescuers" said that they could only save one of them, and left his father (eliminating a potential threat). For this reason alone, Noah displays strong distaste for the officers almost immediately, saying that with their weapons and manpower, they likely could have saved his father as well. When Beth accidentally kills Dr. Gavin Trevitt by giving him the wrong medication, Noah takes the blame by saying that while he was cleaning, he knocked over a ventilation system and caused Trevitt to flatline. For this, Officers Lerner and Gorman take him out into the hall and beat him. Beth later apologizes, only for Noah to insist that he's fine and has been through worse. Nevertheless, Beth decides to form a plan for her and Noah to escape. They use the elevator shaft, which has served as a body disposal chute, and with a long chord of sheets tied together, they both make it down, although Noah loses his grip and falls, spraining one ankle. They both manage to make it outside, where Beth fends off several walkers with a handgun. Although Beth is stopped and restrained by the officers, Noah manages to make it to the outer gate and slips through, running off after he and Beth exchange a final glance. In the episode "Consumed", Noah ambushes Carol and Daryl and demands their weapons.  With no choice, Carol and Daryl give him their assault rifle and crossbow. Noah apologizes and cuts open the tents to release the trapped walkers in order to distract the pair as he escapes. They kill the walkers and Carol aims her revolver at the fleeing Noah, but Daryl stops her. Carol and Daryl later find Noah attempting to move a large bookcase. Daryl attacks him from behind, taking back the weapons and leaving him trapped. A walker gets into the room and Daryl decides to leave Noah to be eaten, but eventually saves him thanks to Carol's insistence. Noah claims he must leave before the people from the hospital find him. Daryl asks Noah if he is referring to Grady Memorial Hospital and if there is a blond girl there, he replies by asking if they are talking about Beth. Realizing Noah knows where Beth is, Carol and Daryl agree to help him, but Noah warns them the police likely heard the gunfire and will be coming to investigate soon. As they attempt to escape, Noah falls behind and Daryl stops to help him. Carol moves ahead and is inadvertently hit by a police car. Noah stops Daryl from interfering, saying the hospital has the resources to treat Carol's injuries, and they helplessly watch as she is taken away. Noah tells him the hospital will be difficult to infiltrate, as they have "guns and people". Daryl replies that "so do we", and together, they commandeer a truck and escape Atlanta to enlist the help of Rick and the rest of the group. In the episode "Crossed", Noah returns to Atlanta, alongside Rick, Daryl, Tyreese, and Sasha, and the group kidnaps three of the officers - Lamson, Shepherd, and Licari. In the episode "Coda", Lamson is killed in an escape attempt, but the group goes through with a prisoner exchange as proposed by Tyreese and Daryl, where they trade Shepherd and Licari for Beth and Carol. However, Lerner refuses to let them keep Noah and demands that he be returned to her care. Although Rick and Beth refuse, Noah offers to return to the hospital in order to avoid bloodshed. Beth still refuses and confronts Lerner, stabbing her with a pair of scissors before Lerner shoots her in the head. Lerner is then killed by Daryl, and after Rick refuses Officer Shepherd's offer to let his group stay at the hospital, Rick extends an offer for anyone from the hospital who wants to leave with his group. Only Noah accepts the offer, and leaves the hospital, ultimately joining Rick's group while grieving for Beth.

In the mid-season premiere "What Happened and What's Going On", Noah travels with the group to his home town of Richmond, Virginia, to the housing development 'Shirewilt Estates', to which the group agree to go with him in order to honor Beth (who wanted to get him there). Once there, he finds that everyone is dead and the community was overrun. He almost immediately breaks down in grief. Later, he runs to his house, where he finds his deceased mother laid on the floor. Tyreese, who is with him, goes forth into Noah's twin brothers' room and finds one of them dead. The other one, a walker, comes up from behind and bites Tyreese and, after this, Noah kills his reanimated brother, and appears to be briefly shocked by his actions. He runs to get help from the rest of the group, but gets targeted by walkers and tries to fend them off. Rick, Michonne, and Glenn come to his rescue. Noah helps the group to get Tyreese out of Shirewilt and is later saddened by the discovery that Tyreese has died. In the episode "Them", Noah is travelling with the group to Washington DC. They find that there is barely anything left in terms of food or water. Noah tells Sasha that he doesn't think he can make it, to which Sasha replies that he won't. Noah helps the group keep the walker herd out of the barn by helping them push against the doors during the storm. In the episode "The Distance", Noah is first seen pointing a gun at Aaron when he is brought back into the barn. While the RV is on its way to the Alexandria Safe-Zone, Noah gives Aaron medicine for Aaron's boyfriend Eric, who was injured. In the episode "Remember", Noah arrives in Alexandria and is assigned to be a runner. He goes on a dry run with Glenn, Tara, Nicholas and Deanna's son, Aidan Monroe. He is shocked by how they string up walkers and attempts to kill one who they want alive. In the episode "Forget", Noah appears at Deanna's party feeling uncomfortable and wanting to leave, but Maggie and Glenn assure him that he is with family now. In the episode "Spend", Noah goes with a group led by Aiden Monroe to get parts for Alexandria's solar panel system. During the mission, Aiden is killed and the group tries to flee but they get stuck between a set of revolving doors with walkers on both sides. Nicholas pushed the rotating door to let himself out, putting Noah and Glenn at risk. A group of walkers pulled Noah through, leaving Glenn to watch his gruesome fate of getting ripped open.

Development and reception
Tyler James Williams was cast as the recurring character Noah on the television series The Walking Dead. Matt Fowler of IGN reviewed the episode "Slabtown", saying: "there were some fun guest stars this week [...] nothing probably tops Beth and Noah on top of the pile of elevator corpses."

Laura Prudom for Variety in her review of the episode "Consumed" commented that "The episode's final moments saw Daryl and Noah tearing back towards the church to load up on guns and people [...] so it looks like the corrupt inhabitants of Grady Memorial are in for a rude awakening." Chris Cabin for Slant Magazine said "At one point, Noah (Tyler James Williams) gets the drop on Daryl and Carol, taking Daryl's favored crossbow and leaving them for dead; later, he pushes a frenzied zombie onto Carol in a desperate panic. And it's ultimately Carol who insists that they don't leave Noah to become a walker's lunch when Daryl takes back his crossbow." Lenika Cruz and David Sims for The Atlantic wrote that "Carol and Daryl rescue Noah because it's the right thing to do, and in turn Noah promises to help Daryl recover Carol, captured by Slabtown goons, and Beth, because both of them worked to help him. Fundamental human decency for the win." Zack Handlen of The A.V. Club commented that "The encounters with Noah made sense, although it was slightly embarrassing to see him get the drop on Carol and Daryl so easily the first time. The ending was rushed, because it needed to get so much resolved at once, but I liked the idea of Noah still wandering around the periphery of the hospital. He has an injured leg, and he's on his own; there's no place else for him to go." Matt Fowler of IGN said, "It wasn't hard to figure out that it was Noah who was following them for those brief few minutes. In fact, a lot of fans already managed to get out ahead of the story back when "Slabtown" aired, predicting that it would be Noah who was with Daryl in the bushes when he returned."

Matt Fowler of IGN reviewed the episode "Crossed" and said that "Noah even said that the orderlies will fight back. But Noah also vouched for Hernández's cop (Lampson? Not 100% sure on that name), saying he was one of the good ones, when he clearly wound up having a devious side. Did Lampson fool Noah too or should this now cast suspicion on Noah?" Sean McKenna of TV Fanatic wrote that one of the cops tricking Sasha was something "I felt like I saw it coming, but it was understandable in wanting to trust him, especially after her talk with Tyreese and Noah vouching for him." Rob Bricken of io9 comments that at the prison exchange in the fifth season's mid-season finale "Coda", Noah agrees to go back to the hospital because he "actually knows Dawn is stupid enough to turn this whole thing into a bloodbath". Melissa Leon of The Daily Beast felt that Beth died to free Noah, rather than let Dawn manipulate her. Scott M. Gimple wanted to tell a story of how Beth was "so strong as to not be able to swallow injustice when it is given to them with Noah being left behind". IGN's Matt Fowler said that "the end result here, without Grady dismantled and without any of the abused imprisoned staff members wanting to go with Rick, was that the show traded Beth for Noah."

In a review of the mid-season premiere "What Happened and What's Going On", Lesley Goldberg wrote that "Noah sprints to his home to see for himself as Tyreese (Chad L. Coleman), who attempted to console the group's newest addition, follows closely behind. As Noah covers his mother's body with a sheet, Tyreese is frozen with grief — likely recalling Lizzie and Mika's deaths — when he sees one of Noah's younger brothers dead in a bed and fails to notice the boy's twin turned walker and winds up being bitten in the arm."
In her review of the episode "Them", Laura Prudom for Variety commented that "The blankness in our survivors' eyes as they mechanically chewed at the dog meat was chilling, but it was Noah's traumatized glance towards a discarded dog collar that delivered the real punch to the gut." In his review of the episode "Spend", Matt Fowler of IGN wrote that "Glenn [...] had to deal with a couple of total s***heels. And poor Noah wound up paying the (really gory) price. That entire revolving door trap scenario was really tense and well done. Especially the part where Glenn had to watch Noah get ripped apart right in front of him. Man, that was brutal." Fowler added that "I did expect Noah to last longer than this. So while I mourn that he didn't stick around longer I also readily admit that it was a good shock. I didn't see it coming. I figured Nicholas would try to do something shifty, but that he'd get punished for it and eaten. This was way worse (though way better, dramatically). And Noah had just found a new role in the town too. One where, after a while, he probably wouldn't have had to be part of the run crew anymore."

References

Fictional African-American people
Fictional characters introduced in 2014
The Walking Dead (franchise) characters